The 18th Annual Tony Awards took place on May 24, 1964, in the New York Hilton in New York City. The ceremony was broadcast on local television station WWOR-TV (Channel 9) in New York City. The host was Sidney Blackmer and the Masters of Ceremonies were Steve Lawrence and Robert Preston.

The ceremony
Presenters: George Abbott, Lauren Bacall, Anne Bancroft, Harry Belafonte, Constance Bennett, Georgia Brown, David Burns, Richard Burton, Mindy Carson, Peggy Cass, Barbara Cook, Sammy Davis Jr., Paul Ford, Robert Goulet, Arthur Hill, Robert Horton, Shirley Knight, Carol Lawrence, Hal March, Mercedes McCambridge, Roddy McDowall, Molly Picon, Lee Remick, Cyril Ritchard, Paul Scofield, Martha Scott, Zachary Scott, Rip Torn, Gwen Verdon.

Music was by Meyer Davis and his Orchestra.

Winners and nominees
Winners are in bold

Special award
Eva Le Gallienne, celebrating her 50th year as an actress, honored for her work with the National Repertory Theatre.

Multiple nominations and awards

These productions had multiple nominations:

11 nominations: Hello, Dolly!    
8 nominations: Funny Girl and High Spirits 
6 nominations: The Ballad of the Sad Café   
5 nominations: She Loves Me  
4 nominations: Barefoot in the Park, Dylan and 110 in the Shade 
3 nominations: The Girl Who Came to Supper and Marathon '33 
2 nominations: After the Fall, Any Wednesday, The Deputy, Foxy, Hamlet, Luther,  Marco Millions, West Side Story and What Makes Sammy Run? 

The following productions received multiple awards.

10 wins: Hello, Dolly!

References

External links
 Tony Awards Official Site

Tony Awards ceremonies
1964 in theatre
1964 awards in the United States
June 1964 events in the United States
1964 in New York City